This is a list of fellows of the Royal Society elected in its eighth year, 1667.

Fellows 
William Aglionby (1642–1705)
Theodor de Beringhen (b. 1644)
Maurice Berkeley (1628–1690)
Charles Berkeley (1649–1710)
Ismael Bullialdus (1605–1694)
Henry Clerke (1622–1687)
Sir Clifford Clifton (1626–1670)
John Collins (1625–1683)
Sir William Curtius (1599–1678)
John Downes (1627–1694)
Sir Bernard Gascoigne (1614–1687)
Thomas Harley (d. 1685)
Sir Thomas Lake (1657–1711)
Johann Borkman Leyonbergh (1625–1691)
Richard Lower (1631–1691)
Jacques du Moulin (d. 1686)
Walter Needham (1631–1691)
Nicholas Oudart (d. 1681)
John Pearson (1613–1686)
Pierre Petit (1594–1677)
John Ray (1627–1705)
Bullen Reymes (1613–1672)
Sir Philip Skippon (1641–1691)
Francis Smethwick (d. 1682)
Sir William Soame (1644–1686)
Sir Nicholas Stuart (1616–1710)
Carlo Ubaldini (1665–1667)

References

1667
1667 in science
1667 in England